AfroBasket 2011 was the 26th FIBA Africa Championship, played under the auspices of the Fédération Internationale de Basketball, the basketball sport governing body, and the African zone thereof. At stake is the berth allocated to Africa in the 2012 Summer Olympics basketball tournament. The tournament was scheduled to be hosted by Côte d'Ivoire, with games to be played in Abidjan. However, in 2011 Madagascar was chosen as host replacement due to a political crisis in Côte d'Ivoire.

Tunisia won the title for the first time after defeating Angola 67–56 in the final.

Host Selection Process
Côte d'Ivoire's selection as the host country was decided by the Fédération Internationale de Basketball (FIBA) Executive Committee, approved by the Central Board of FIBA Africa, and officially announced in Abidjan on March 23, 2010.  Côte d'Ivoire's bid was selected over bids from Madagascar and Nigeria.  Madagascar was on hold as a backup host should Côte d'Ivoire not be able to host the championships.  This would have been the second time that Côte d'Ivoire has hosted the FIBA Africa Championship, after they won the tournament as hosts in 1985.
On April 26, 2011, it was announced that Madagascar would host the tournament in its capital Antananarivo after the political unrest in Côte d'Ivoire put them irreparably behind schedule in outfitting their arenas.

Venue

Qualification

Participants were sixteen national basketball teams among the 53 FIBA Africa members, determined through qualification processes before the final tournament. These teams included the host nation, the top four sides at the FIBA Africa Championship 2009 in Libya (including Côte d'Ivoire, which finished second at the 2009 tournament) and the top twelve sides at the 2009 Zone preliminary basketball competitions. Because the qualification process doubles as qualification for the 2010 All-Africa Games, all African nations competed in qualifying, including those that have previously qualified for the tournament. The following national teams have secured qualification:

Squads

Format
FIBA Africa debuted a revised format at the 2009 championship.  As of August 2010, FIBA Africa has given no indication that this formation will change for the 2011 event:
The teams were divided into four groups (Groups A–D) for the preliminary round.
Round robin for the preliminary round; all teams advanced to the next round.
From there on a knockout system was used until the final.

Group stage
All Times are UTC+3

Group A

Group B

Group C

Group D

Knockout stage

Championship bracket
All Times are in Local Time UTC+3

Eighth Finals

Quarterfinals

Semifinals

Bronze medal game

Final

5–8th place bracket

Semifinals

Seventh place game

Fifth place game

Placement games

Awards

All-Tournament Team 
  Marouan Kechrid
  Carlos Morais
  Ime Udoka
  Makrem Ben Romdhane
  Salah Mejri

Final standings

Statistical leaders

Points

Rebounds

Assists

Blocks

Steals

See also
2011 FIBA Africa Clubs Champions Cup

References

External links
Official Website

 
2011
2011 in African basketball
2011 in Malagasy sport
International basketball competitions hosted by Madagascar
August 2011 sports events in Africa